Pesni tibetskikh lam (lit. Songs of Tibetan Lamas) is the first album by the Russian singer Linda, released in June 1994.

Track listing

1995 debut albums
Linda (singer) albums